Ruhulla Fatulla oghlu Axhundov (9 April 1886 – 5 May 1959) was an Azerbaijani actor, director, People's Artist of the USSR.

Biography 
Sidgi Ruhulla was born on April 9, 1886 in Buzovna. In 1904, his father, Mullah Fatulla, died, and Ruhulla sold his father's household goods and went to Moscow to study with the money he had saved. However, due to financial difficulties, Ruhulla could not complete his education and returned to Baku.

After he played the role of Sidgi Bey very skillfully in N. Kamal's play "Vatan" on November 6, 1910, he took the stage-name Sidgi and became known as Sidgi Ruhulla in the history of theater.

S. Ruhulla died on May 5, 1959 in Baku.

In 1987 (January 30) and 2006 the 100th and 120th anniversaries of the birth of People's Artist of the USSR Sidgi Ruhulla were celebrated.

Career 
In the early XX century, male actors played female roles on Azerbaijani stage. This lasted until the 20s and 30s of the XX century. Ruhulla's first role was "Telli" in the comedy "He has a name, not himself" by Najaf bey Vazirov, directed by Huseyn Arablinski and staged on December 21, 1908 in Balakhani drama association. S. Ruhulla skillfully performed his first performance "Rustam bey" in the tragedy "Fakhraddin's misfortune" in the hall of "Seamen's Club" in Baku. After the performance, Abdurrahim bey Hagverdiyev, Najaf bey Vazirov, Hasan bey Zardabi and others congratulated Sidgi.

Ruhulla played one after another the roles of "Musa" in the tragedy of A. Hagverdiyev "The Unlucky Young Man" (directed by H. Arablinski, 4 May 1909, Yerevan), "Tahmas" in the tragedy of N. Narimanov “Nadir-shah” (directed by H. Arablinski, 10 May 1909, Yerevan), "Berezin" in the work of E. Chirikov “The Jews” (directed by H. Arablinski, 15 May 1909, Yerevan), "Qatran Bey" in the comedy of Molière "Le Médecin malgré lui" (directed by H. Arablinski, 20 May 1909, Yerevan), Nadir Shah in N. Narimanov's "Nadir-shah" tragedy (directed by M. Kazimovski, 8 December 1909, Baku), Fakhraddin in N. Vazirov's "Fakhraddin's misfortune" tragedy (directed by M. Kazimovski, 11 December 1909, Baku).

In 1906-1920, S. Ruhulla performed in more than 250 cities and regions. He had visited Moscow, Saint Petersburg, Tabriz, Tehran, Rasht, Qazvin, Isfahan, Shiraz, Samarkand, Bukhara, Merv, Ashgabat, Kharkiv, Kyiv, Tula, Tbilisi, Yerevan, Krasnovodsk, Derbent, Makhachkala, Vladikavkaz, Grozny, Andijan, Ufa, Sarab, Ardabil, Anzali, Kazan, Batumi, Odessa, Rostov, Sukhumi, Yalta, Sevastopol, Simferopol, Tuapse, Sochi.

Sidgi Ruhulla founded a professional theater in Tabriz in 1909 with the help of local intellectuals. In 1919, Department of Enlightenment of South Azerbaijan awarded Sidgi Ruhulla with a gold medal for his contributions to the establishment and development of theatrical culture in South Azerbaijan and Iran.

Filmography 
 Bismillah (1925)
 Gilanian girl (1928)
 Haji Gara (1929)
 Golden bush (1930)
 Peasantry (1939)
 Fatali Khan (1947)

Awards 
 Honored Artist of the Azerbaijan SSR — 23 April 1931
 People's Artist of the Azerbaijan SSR — 4 December 1938
 Order of the Red Banner of Labour — 22 July 1949
 "Stalin" Prize (2nd degree) — 1948
 People's Artist of the USSR — 22 July 1949
 Order of Lenin — 27 October 1956
 Medal "For Labour Valour"
 Medal "For the Defence of the Caucasus"

Gallery

References 

1886 births
1959 deaths
People's Artists of the USSR
Stalin Prize winners
Azerbaijani male silent film actors
Azerbaijani theatre directors
Azerbaijani opera directors
20th-century Azerbaijani male actors
Soviet male actors
People's Artists of the Azerbaijan SSR